Lovely is the first album by singer Jocelyn Enriquez. It was released in 1994 on Classified Records. Lovely includes the hit singles "I've Been Thinking About You" (#80 on the Billboard Hot 100), "Make It Last Forever", "Big Love" and "Only".

During this album, Enriquez was ironically labeled as a "sell-out" by some members of the Philippine-American community because of her Spanish rendition of "I've Been Thinking About You", considering that the Philippines is a Hispanic nation having been part of the Spanish Empire for over three centuries.

The single was re-recorded in Spanish due to a trend in freestyle dance music at the time and to appeal to the huge Latin demographic of the freestyle community. The Spanish lyrics were also translated by Monica Lisa Bernard, formerly of the freestyle trio, Heaven (With All My Heart). Enriquez's personal favorite song off the album is "Big Love", due to the Donna Summer relevance.

"Lovely" was also re-released and re-mastered in 1999 and noted as "Lovely" (Digital Remaster). The album is now available for digital sale on iTunes and all singles from this album: "I've Been Thinking About You", "Make This Last Forever", "You Are the One", "Big Love", "Big Love (Energy Box Mixes)", and "Only".

Track listing

Charts
Singles - Billboard (North America)

References

1994 debut albums
Jocelyn Enriquez albums